Empoli F.C. Youth Sector comprises the under-19 team and the academy of Italian professional football club Empoli F.C. The under-19 squad competes in Campionato Primavera 1, and won the championship in 1998–99 and 2020-21.

Primavera

Current squad

Non-playing staff (under-19 squad)
 Head Coach: Alessandro Dal Canto
 Assistant Coach Giuliano Lamma
 Fitness Coaches: Francesco Carchedi / Matteo D'Elia
 Goalkeeping Coach: Emiliano Betti
 Team Doctor: Cavalli Eligio
 Physiotherapist: Francesco Fondelli

Honours
Campionato Nazionale Primavera
Champions (1): 1998–99
Campionato Primavera 1
Champions (1): 2020-21

References

External links
 Official website 

Empoli F.C.
Football academies in Italy
Football clubs in Tuscany